Nicolae Steinhardt (born Nicu-Aurelian Steinhardt; July 29, 1912 – March 29, 1989) was a Romanian writer, Orthodox monk and lawyer. His main book, Jurnalul Fericirii, is regarded as a major text of 20th century Romanian literature and a prime example of Eastern European anti-Communist literature.

Biography

Early life
He was born in Pantelimon commune, near Bucharest, from a Jewish father and a Romanian mother. His father was an engineer, architect and decorated World War I participant (following the Battle of Mărăști). Due to his lineage from his father side, he was to be subject to anti-semitic discrimination during the fascist governments of World War II Romania.

Between 1919 and 1929, he attended Spiru Haret primary school and college in Bucharest, where, despite his background, he was taught Religion by a Christian priest. His talent for writing was first noticed when he joined the Sburătorul literary circle.

Early career and World War II
In 1934, he took his license diploma from the Law and Literature School of the University of Bucharest. Under the pseudonym Antisthius, one of La Bruyères Caractères, he published his first volume, the parodic novel  ("In the Manner of Cioran, Noica, Eliade..."). In 1936, he took his PhD in Constitutional Law, and between 1937 and 1938, he travelled to Switzerland, Austria, France and England.

In 1939, Steinhardt worked as an editor for Revista Fundațiilor Regale (a government-sponsored literary magazine), losing his job between 1940 and 1944, during the ethnic cleansing under the Iron Guard regime (the National Legionary State) and the one led by Ion Antonescu. Despite his problems with the latter, he would forgive Antonescu, and even praise him for allegedly having saved several hundred thousand Jews (which he claimed had occurred after a face-to-face debate with Adolf Hitler at Berchtesgaden).

Communist persecutions and imprisonment
In 1944 he was reinstated at the Revista Fundațiilor Regale, and held his job until 1948, when King Michael I was forced to abdicate by the Communist Party of Romania.

From 1948 until 1959, he witnessed a new period of deprivation, this time from the Romanian Communist regime – when non-communist intellectuals were deemed "enemies of the people". In 1959, during the kangaroo court trial of his former school colleague Constantin Noica, he refused to take part as a witness against him. As a consequence, he was accused of "crimes of conspiracy against social order", he was included in the "batch of mystical-Iron Guardist intellectuals", and sentenced to thirteen years of forced labor, in gulag-like prisons. He would serve his penalty at Jilava, Gherla, Aiud and other communist jails.

While in prison, he was baptized Orthodox Christian, on March 15, 1960, by fellow convict Mina Dobzeu, a well known Bessarabian hermit, having as godfather Emanuel Vidrașcu, a former chief of staff and adjutant of Antonescu. Witnesses to the event were also Alexandru Paleologu, two Roman Catholic priests, two Greek-Catholic priests and a Protestant priest. He would later state that his baptism had an "ecumenical character". This episode would be the base for his best-known and most celebrated work, the Happiness Diary.

Later years
After his release in 1964, he has a successful and notable activity as translator and publisher. His first celebrated literary works, Între viață și cărți ("Between Life and Books"), and Incertitudini literare ("Literary Uncertainties") were published in 1976 and 1980, respectively.

A new chapter in Steinhardt's life began in 1980, after being accepted in Rohia Monastery. He worked as the monastery’s librarian, while at the same time dedicating himself to writing. During this time, his fame as a counselor and father-confessor had grown, attracting tens of visitors weekly to Rohia.

He died at Baia Mare city hospital. His funeral, under surveillance by the Securitate, was attended by many of his close friends and admirers.

In 2017, Steinhardt was posthumously elected a member of the Romanian Academy.

The Happiness Diary
The first edition was confiscated by the Securitate in 1972, and restituted in 1975, after censorship intervention. Meanwhile, he had finished writing a second version of the book, which is in its turn confiscated in 1984. In the end, Steinhardt edited several versions, one of which had reached Monica Lovinescu and Virgil Ierunca in Paris; Monica Lovinescu would later broadcast the book in a series of episodes, via Radio Free Europe.

Works
Due to political reasons, most of his work has been published post-mortem in its uncensored version (after the Romanian Revolution).
 În genul ... tinerilor (In the Manner of... Youth) - published 1934;
 Între viață și cărți (Between Life and Books) – published 1976;
 Incertitudini literare (Literary Uncertainties) - published 1980;
 Geo Bogza - Un poet al Efectelor, Exaltării, Grandiosului, Solemnității, Exuberanței și Patetismului (Geo Bogza – A Poet of Effects, Exaltations, Grandiosity, Solemnity, Exuberance and Pathetism) – published 1982;
 Critică la persoana întâi (First-Person Critique) – published 1983;
 Escale în timp și spațiu (Stop-over in Time and Space) – published 1987;
 Prin alții spre sine (Through Others Towards Self) – published 1988;

Post-mortem
 Jurnalul fericirii (Happiness Diary) – published 1991;
 Monologul polifonic (The Polyphonic Monologue) – published 1991;
 Dăruind vei dobândi (Giving You Will Receive) – published 1992;
 Primejdia mărturisirii (The Danger of Confessing) – published 1993;
 Drumul către iubire (The Road to Love) – published 1999;
 Taina împărtășirii (The Miracle of Communion);
 Călătoria unui fiu risipitor (Travel of a Prodigal Son);
 Drumul către isihie (The Path Toward Hesychia);
 Ispita lecturii (The Temptation of Reading);
 N. Steinhardt răspunde la 365 de întrebări adresate de Zaharia Sângeorzan (N. Steinhardt Answers 365 Questions Posed by Zaharia Sângiorzan);
 Între lumi (Between Worlds);
 Dumnezeu în care spui că nu crezi... (Scrisori către Virgil Ierunca) (The God in Whom You Say You Don't Believe... Letters To Virgin Ierunca);
 Eu însumi și alți cîțiva (Myself And a Few Others);
 Eseu romanțat asupra unei neizbînzi (Romanticized Essay About a Failure);
 Timpul Smochinelor (Time of Figs)

Notes

1912 births
1989 deaths
Romanian Orthodox monks
20th-century Eastern Orthodox theologians
20th-century Romanian writers
20th-century diarists
Romanian diarists
Romanian theologians
Romanian magazine editors
Romanian literary critics
20th-century essayists
Male essayists
Romanian essayists
20th-century translators
Romanian translators
People from Ilfov County
Romanian people of Jewish descent
Converts to Eastern Orthodoxy from Judaism
Spiru Haret National College (Bucharest) alumni
People detained by the Securitate
Inmates of Aiud prison
Inmates of Gherla prison
Members of the Romanian Academy elected posthumously